Bromus scoparius, the broom brome, is a species of flowering plant in the family Poaceae. It is native to the Mediterranean, Crimea, the Middle East, the Caucasus region, Central Asia, Xinjiang in China, and on to the northwest Indian Subcontinent, and has been introduced to Chile, California, a few locales in the eastern US, and southeast China. A somewhat weedy annual, it prefers to grow in grasslands.

References

scoparius
Flora of North Africa
Flora of Southwestern Europe
Flora of Southeastern Europe
Flora of the Crimean Peninsula
Flora of South European Russia
Flora of the Caucasus
Flora of Saudi Arabia
Flora of the Gulf States
Flora of Western Asia
Flora of Central Asia
Flora of Pakistan
Flora of West Himalaya
Flora of India (region)
Flora of Xinjiang
Taxa named by Carl Linnaeus
Plants described in 1755